Sophora rapaensis is a species of flowering plant in the family Fabaceae, that is endemic  to French Polynesia.

References

rapaensis
Flora of French Polynesia
Data deficient plants
Taxonomy articles created by Polbot